This is a list of animated television series first aired in 1995.

Anime television series first aired in 1995

See also
 List of animated feature films of 1995
 List of Japanese animation television series of 1995

References

Television series
Animated series
1995
1995
1995-related lists